Coming Out is the third album by The Manhattan Transfer, released August 19, 1976, on Atlantic Records.

The single "Chanson d'Amour" hit the No. 1 spot in the United Kingdom for three weeks.

The song "Zindy Lou" featured Ringo Starr and Jim Keltner on drums, Dr. John on piano, and Doug Thorngren on percussion. The song "Poinciana (The Song of the Tree)" featured a solo by Michael Brecker.

Track listing

LP side 1 
 "Don't Let Go" (Jesse Stone) - 2:45
 "Zindy Lou" (Johnny Moore, Eddie Smith) – 2:50
 "Chanson D'Amour" (Wayne Shanklin) – 2:55
 "Helpless" (Holland-Dozier-Holland) – 3:07
 "Scotch and Soda" (Dave Guard) – 2:59
 "The Speak Up Mambo (Cuentame)" (Al Castellanos) – 3:05

LP side 2 
 "Poinciana (The Song of the Tree)" (Nat Simon, Buddy Bernier) – 4:11
 "S.O.S." (Ron Roker, Gerry Shury, Phil Swern)  - 3:10
 "Popsicle Toes" (Michael Franks) – 4:16
 "It Wouldn't Have Made Any Difference" (Todd Rundgren) – 3:30
 "The Thought of Loving You" (David White) – 2:56

The album was re-released on CD in March 1993.

Personnel 
The Manhattan Transfer
 Tim Hauser – vocals, vocal arrangements (1-4, 6, 8, 11), song concept (7)
 Laurel Massé – vocals, vocal arrangements (1, 4, 10)
 Alan Paul – vocals, vocal arrangements (1, 11), song concept (7)
 Janis Siegel – vocals, vocal arrangements (1-8, 10, 11)

Musicians

 Paul Griffin – organ (1)
 Dr. John – acoustic piano (2)
 John Barnes – acoustic piano (3)
 Steve Paietta – accordion (3)
 Clarence McDonald – acoustic piano (4, 8)
 Bill Payne – acoustic piano (5, 10)
 Roger Steinman – acoustic piano (5)
 Arthur Jenkins – acoustic piano (6), arrangements (6)
 Dave Frishberg – acoustic piano (9), clavinet (9)
 Mike Melvoin – acoustic piano (11)
 Ira Newborn – guitar, orchestral arrangements, musical director, vocal arrangements (5, 9), electric autoharp (10)
 Ben Benay – guitar (3)
 Bob Bowles – rhythm guitar (9, 10)
 Andy Muson – bass
 Roy Markowitz – drums (1, 6)
 Jim Keltner – drums (2, 8)
 Ringo Starr – drums (2, 8)
 Jim Gordon – drums (3, 9)
 Rick Shlosser – drums (4, 11)
 Jim Nelson – drums (5)
 David Kemper – drums (10)
 Bobbye Hall – percussion (1), congas (10)
 Doug Thorngren – percussion (2)
 Ralph MacDonald – percussion (4, 11), congas (6)
 Nicky Marrero – timbales (6)
 Johnny "Dandy" Rodriguez Jr – bongos (6), cowbell (6)
 Michael Brecker – tenor saxophone (1)
 Jay Migliori – tenor sax solo (3)
 Jackie Kelso – baritone sax solo (4), tenor sax solo (8)
 Randy Brecker – trumpet (1)

Production 

 Richard Perry – producer
 Tim Hauser – assistant producer
 Douglas Botnick – engineer
 Lewis Hahn – engineer
 Rick Rowe – engineer
 Howard Steele – engineer, remixing
 Dennis Devlin – assistant engineer
 Dan Latham – assistant engineer
 Tim Sadler – assistant engineer
 Allen Zentz – mastering
 Bob Defrin – art direction, design
 Abie Sussman – art direction, design
 Suze Randall – cover photography

Certifications

References

External links
 Manhattan Transfer official website

1976 albums
The Manhattan Transfer albums
Albums produced by Richard Perry
Atlantic Records albums